The 2016 Welsh Liberal Democrats leadership election took place following the resignation of Kirsty Williams following the 2016 elections to the Welsh Assembly where the Welsh Liberal Democrats fell from five seats to one.

Kirsty Williams resigned on 6 May 2016  with Mark Williams being appointed acting leader that evening before being confirmed as leader by the party's National Executive Committee the following day.

Williams went on to serve as leader for a little over a year until his resignation in June 2017.

References

Welsh Liberal Democrats
Leaders of political parties in Wales
Political party leadership elections in Wales
Welsh Liberal Democrats leadership election